Derp may refer to: 

Mr. Derp, a minor character in South Park, a show that popularized the Internet slang word derp
Drug Effectiveness Review Project
D.E.R.P., a robot character seen in the Fresh Beat Band of Spies episode "Dance Bots"
"Derp", a track released in 2014 by Bassjackers and MAKJ
Derp (hacker group), also known as Derptrolling, a former hacker group

See also 
Darp, a town in the Netherlands
Derpy, a background character in My Little Pony: Friendship Is Magic